Raymond Park is a  public park in southeast Portland, Oregon's Powellhurst-Gilbert neighborhood, in the United States. The park was acquired in 1993. A Portland Loo was installed in Raymond Park in 2018.

References

External links

 

Parks in Portland, Oregon
Powellhurst-Gilbert, Portland, Oregon
Southeast Portland, Oregon